Glenea ochraceolineata is a species of beetle in the family Cerambycidae. It was described by Bernhard Schwarzer in 1931. It is known from Malaysia and Borneo.

References

ochraceolineata
Beetles described in 1931